Josef Streb (16 April 1912 – 22 August 1986) was a German footballer who participated at the 1934 FIFA World Cup. He played club football with Wacker München.

References

External links
FIFA profile

1912 births
1986 deaths
German footballers
1934 FIFA World Cup players
Association football forwards